The fourteenth season of South African Idols premiered on July 8, 2018, on the Mzansi Magic television network. ProVerb continued his role as the show's host and an executive producer while Somizi Mhlongo, Unathi Nkayi and Randall Abrahams also remained as the main judges, with guest judges at each audition city.

Auditions 
Auditions began in January and ended in March.

Finalists

Weekly Song Choice and Result

Top 16

Boys (2 September)

Girls (9 September)

Top 10 (16 September)

Top 9: The 90s (23 September)

Top 8 - Orchestral Delight (30 September)

Top 7: Showstopper (7 October)

Top 6: Celebration of South African Music (14 October)

Top 5 (21 October)

Top 4 (28 October)

Top 3: Semi-Final (4 November) 

 Before the Top 3 were announced, King B also got to duet with Mmatema Moremi they performed Smother by Craig Lucas & Paxton

Top 2: Final (11 November) 

 Before her elimination Thando performed her debut single "Wasting Time".

Elimination Chart 
Colour key

References 
Idols South Africa Website
TVSA Idols Page
Idols South Africa Fan Website

Season 14
2018 South African television seasons